Palghar Lok Sabha constituency is one of the 48 Lok Sabha (lower house of Indian parliament) constituencies of Maharashtra state in western India. This constituency was created on 19 February 2008 as a part of the implementation of the Presidential notification based on the recommendations of the Delimitation Commission of India constituted on 12 July 2002. The seat is reserved for Scheduled Tribes. It first held elections in 2009 and its first member of parliament (MP) was Baliram Sukur Jadhav of Bahujan Vikas Aghadi. As of the 2014 election, Chintaman Vanaga of the Bharatiya Janata Party represented this constituency in the Lok Sabha. After sudden demise of Chintaman Vanaga, Bharatiya Janata Party gave ticket to Rajendra Gavit for by-elections.

Assembly segments
Palghar Lok Sabha constituency comprises six Vidhan Sabha (legislative assembly) segments. These segments are:

Members of Parliament

^ by-poll

Election Results

General elections 2019

By Election 2018

General Election 2014

General Election 2009

See also
 Mumbai North Lok Sabha constituency
 Dahanu Lok Sabha constituency
 Thane district
 List of Constituencies of the Lok Sabha

Notes

External links
Palghar lok sabha  constituency election 2019 results details

Lok Sabha constituencies in Maharashtra
Lok Sabha constituencies in Maharashtra created in 2008
Palghar district